The Sunni Students Council is a council for Muslim students headquartered at Kerala. Currently 3486 Members and 68 staffs serving for the organization. The mission of the organization is "Giving the Muslim students the necessary knowledge about the Humanity and Indian culture and Blocking from the Wrong things like Terrorism and Wahhabism.

List of Secretaries-General

References

Sunni organizations
Sufi organizations
Youth movements
Islam in Kerala
Islamic organisations based in India
Sunni Islam in India
Sunni Students Council
Student organisations in India
Member organizations of the Sunni Students Council
Student religious organizations